The Kachin Levies  were a British special force created in World War II in Burma. The Levies were made up of members of the Kachin people under the command of British officers and they fought the Japanese in the jungle of north Burma.

Edmund Leach set up the Levies at Fort Hertz, and they were initially placed under the command of Colonel Gamble, a retired Australian Burma Military Police officer.

See also
V Force

References

Kachin people
Military units and formations of Burma in World War II